Colonial House may refer to:

Colonial House (TV series)
American colonial architecture
Colonial House (also called McIntyre House), listed on the NRHP in Salt Lake City, Utah
 Colonial House, North Shields, a seamen's hostel in North Shields